East Concord is a small hamlet in the town of Sardinia in southern Erie County, New York, United States. It is located at the intersection of Savage Road with Genesse Road.

References

Hamlets in New York (state)
Hamlets in Erie County, New York